Fatal accidents on the Billown Course, Castletown, Isle of Man during the Southern 100, Pre-TT Classic and the Post TT Races.

List of fatal accidents involving competitors

Sources

See also
Isle of Man TT Races
Manx Grand Prix
Clypse Course
St. John's Short Course
List of Snaefell Mountain Course fatal accidents

Billown Circuit fatal accidents
Billown Circuit
Billown Circuit fatal accidents